Proton Theatre is an independent company based in Hungary. It was founded in 2009 and is operating according to the production concept shaped by Kornél Mundruczó (film and theatre director) and Dóra Büki (theatre producer). The virtual artistic group is organized around the director's independent productions.

History 
Mundruczó has worked in the theatre field since 2003. During his career, he has developed a unique working method, already put to use in 2007 with his piece Frankenstein-project at Bárka Theatre. This highly acclaimed work was to be the Proton Theatre's founding production. It convinced him of the need for a “base”, where he could work freely with his own company. Theatre producer Dóra Büki devised the organisation's operational structure to ensure long runs of their performances. Thus, in 2009, the Proton Theatre was born.

Besides preserving maximum artistic freedom, their goal is to provide a professional framework for their independently produced theatre plays and projects.

Chiefly, their performances are realized as international co-productions, and their frequent collaborators include the Vienna Festival; HAU Hebbel am Ufer, Berlin; KunstenFestivalDesArts, Brussels; Trafó House of Contemporary Arts, Budapest; and HELLERAU, Dresden. Besides productions directed by the artistic leader – namely, The Ice (2006), Frankenstein-project (2007), Hard to be a God (2010), Disgrace (2012), Dementia (2013), Winterreise (2015), Imitation of life (2016), The Raft of the Medusa (2018) and Evolution (2019) – they wish to provide space for the realisation of the company members’ ideas. In this spirit, the following performances were created: Last (2014), directed by Roland Rába, 1 link (2015), directed by Gergely Bánki, and Finding Quincy by János Szemenyei.

Their co-producers are among the most prestigious festivals and theatres. On their first international co-production, Hard to be a God, the main co-producer was KunstenFestivalDesArts, on their second, Disgrace, the Vienna Festival, on their third, Dementia, HAU Hebbel am Ufer, and Vienna Festival again on their fourth. Their constant partner in Hungary is Trafó House of Contemporary Arts.

Proton Theatre performances have toured more than 110 festivals over the years – from Festival d’Avignon and the Adelaide Festival to the Singapore International Festival of Arts, the Seoul Bo:m Festival, and the Zürcher Theater Spektakel. In 2017 their performance Imitation of life was nominated for the Faust Award for Mundruczó's outstanding directorial achievement. It was the first time in the history of this award that a non-German theatre was nominated.

Productions

The Seven Deadly Sins/Motherland 
Kornél Mundruczó has paired his production of The Seven Deadly Sins with the drama Motherland, which explores the subjects of capitalist exploitation and the exercise of power in a family of the present day.

Evolution 
Based on György Ligeti's Requiem the world premier of Kornél Mundruczó and Proton Theatre lies on the boundary of concert and theatre and analyses the theme of repetition.

Festival invitations
 Ruhrtriennale 2019. Bochum, Germany

The Raft of the Medusa 

The Raft of the Medusa, an oratory by Hans Werner Henze, was inspired by Théodore Géricault's famous painting by the same name from 1819. Directed by Kornél Mundruczó, this installation of the Proton Theatre aimed to tell the story of The Raft of the Medusa – one that is universally valid and spans different eras – from a unique perspective.

Festival invitations
 Ruhrtriennale 2018. Bochum, Germany

Finding Quincy

Imitation of life 

Festival invitations
 Vienna Festival 2016. Vienna, Austria
 Theater Oberhausen 2016. Germany
 Wiesbaden Biennale 2016. Germany
 HELLERAU - European Center for the Arts 2016. Dresden, Germany
 HAU Hebbel am Ufer 2016. Berlin, Germany
 NEXT Festival 2016. Lille, France
 Platonov Arts Festival 2017. Voronezh, Russia
 17th National Theatre Festival 2017. Pécs, Hungary
 Festival Boulevard 2017. 's-Hertogenbosch, The Netherlands
 Zürcher Theater Spektakel 2017. Switzerland
 Baltic House Festival 2017. Saint Petersburg, Russia
 Sirenos Festival 2017. Vilnius, Lithuania
 Spring in Autumn 2017. Utrecht, The Netherlands
 Łaźnia Nowa Teatr 2017. Cracow, Poland
 TR Warszawa 2017. Warsaw, Poland
 dunaPart4 - Platform of Contemporary Hungarian Performing Arts 2017. Budapest, Hungary
 Lessingtage 2018. Thalia Theater Hamburg, Germany
 MC93 2018. Bobigny, France
 Théâtre de Vidy 2018. Lausanne, Switzerland
 Maillon 2018. Strasbourg, France
 Alkantara Festival 2018. Lisbon, Portugal
 Athens Festival 2018. Greece
 Theaterfestival Basel 2018. Switzerland
 26th International Festival Theatre 2018. Pilsen, Czech Republic
 CDN Orléans 2018. France
 VIE Festival 2019. Bologna, Italy
 MESS International Theatre Festival 2019. Sarajevo, Bosnia and Herzegovina
 FIT Festival 2019. Lugano, Switzerland

Award
Best scenery: Márton Ágh - Hungarian Theatre Critics' Association
Best writing and dramaturgy: Kata Wéber and Soma Boronkay - 17th National Theatre Festival 2017. Pécs, Hungary
Best scenery: Márton Ágh - 17th National Theatre Festival 2017. Pécs, Hungary
Audience Award - Baltic House Festival 2017. Saint Petersburg, Russia

Winterreise 

Festival invitations
 "Fremd bin ich..." Classical Music Festival - Mousonturm 2017. Frankfurt am Main, Germany
 HAU Hebbel am Ufer 2017. Berlin, Germany
 HELLERAU - European Center for the Arts 2018. Dresden, Germany
 Wiener Festwochen 2018. Vienna, Austria
 Mittelfest 2018. Cividale del Friuli, Italy
 Maillon 2019. Strasbourg, France

1 link 
Since January 2019, the Katona József Theatre’s "Sufni" (Shed) Studio has hosted the performance based on the award-winning cyber novel written under a pseudonym.

Festival invitations
 National Theatre of Pécs 2016. Pécs, Hungary

Last 

Festival invitations
 National Theatre of Pécs 2015. Pécs, Hungary
 Jászai Mari Theatre 2016. Tatabánya, Hungary
 National Theatre of Szeged 2017. Szeged, Hungary

Dementia 

Festival invitations
 SPIELART Festival 2013. Munich, Germany
 Novart Festival 2013. Théâtre National de Bordeaux en Aquitaine, France
 HELLERAU - European Center for the Arts 2014. Dresden, Germany
 HAU Hebbel am Ufer 2014. Berlin, Germany
 Maria Matos Teatro Municipal 2014. Lisboa, Portugal
 Nová Dráma Festival 2014. Bratislava, Slovakia
 New Plays from Europe 2014. Mousonturm, Frankfurt am Main, Germany
 Noorderzon Performing Arts Festival 2014. Groningen, The Netherlands
 Festival De Keuze 2014. Rotterdamse Schouwburg, The Netherlands
 Baltic House Festival 2014. Saint Petersburg, Russia
 NET Festival 2014. Moscow, Russia
 Automne en Normandie 2014. Evreux, France
 NEXT Festival 2014. Lille, France
 Nervöse Systeme 2014. Schauspielhaus Zürich, Switzerland
 Lessingtage 2015. Thalia Theater, Hamburg, Germany
 dunaPart3 - Platform of Contemporary Hungarian Performing Arts 2015. Budapest, Hungary
 Singapore International Festival of Arts 2015. Singapore
 International Theatre Forum TEART 2016. Minsk, Belarus
 Theatre World Brno 2017. Czech Republic

Award
 Critics’ Award - Baltic House Festival 2014. Saint Petersburg, Russia

Disgrace 

Festival invitations
 Vienna Festival 2012. Vienna, Austria
 KunstenFestivalDesArts 2012. Brussels, Belgium
 Malta Festival 2012. Poznan, Poland
 Festival d’Avignon 2012. France
 HAU Hebbel am Ufer 2012. Berlin, Germany
 Romaeuropa Festival 2012. Rome, Italy
 Hungarian Showcase 2013. Budapest, Hungary
 National Theatre of Pécs 2013. Pécs, Hungary
 13th National Theatre Festival 2013. Pécs, Hungary
 Tampere Theatre Festival 2013. Finland
 Züricher Theater Spektakel 2013. Switzerland
 Maillon 2014. Strasbourg, France
 NEXT Festival 2015. Lille, France
 Mousonturm 2015. Frankfurt am Main, Germany
 24th International Festival Theatre 2016. Plzeň, Czech Republic

Awards
 Best direction: Kornél Mundruczó - 13th National Theatre Festival 2013. Pécs, Hungary
 Best scenery: Márton Ágh - 13th National Theatre Festival 2013. Pécs, Hungary

Hard to be a God 

Festival invitations
 KunstenFestivalDesArts 2010. Brussels, Belgium
 Alkantara Festival 2010. Lisbon, Portugal
 Theater der Welt 2010. Essen, Germany
 Festival de Keuze 2010. Rotterdamse Schouwburg, The Netherlands
 Novart Festival 2010. Théâtre National de Bordeaux en Aquitaine, France
 dunaPart2 - Platform of Contemporary Hungarian Performing Arts 2011. Budapest, Hungary
 POT Festival 2011. Tallinn, Estonia
 Vienna Festival 2011. Vienna, Austria
 Malta Festival 2011. Poznan, Poland
 La Batie – Festival de Geneve 2011. Geneva, Switzerland
 La Filature 2011. Mulhouse, France
 Politics in Independent Theatre - HELLERAU 2011. Dresden, Germany
 Adelaide Festival 2012. Adelaide, Australia
 MESS International Theatre Festival 2012. Sarajevo, Bosnia and Herzegovina
 Arm und Reich Festival 2013. Schauspielhaus Zürich, Switzerland
 BITEF Festival 2013. Belgrade, Serbia
 Summer Festival 2020. Gyula, Hungary

Awards
Price of the Federal Agency for Civic Education - 8th Politics in Independent Theatre; Staatsschauspiel Dresden 2011. HELLERAU, Germany
International Association of Theatre Critics (IATC) award - MESS International Theatre Festival 2012. Sarajevo, Bosnia and Herzegovina
MESS Forum "Luka Pavlović" Award by Theatre Critics and Journalists - MESS International Theatre Festival 2012. Sarajevo, Bosnia and Herzegovina
Special Mention of MESS Jury - MESS International Theatre Festival 2012. Sarajevo, Bosnia and Herzegovina

Frankenstein-project 

Festival invitations
 Festival Premiéres 2008. Strasbourg, France
 8th National Theatre Festival 2008. Pécs, Hungary
 New Plays from Europe 2008. Wiesbaden, Germany
 International Theatre Festival Divadelná Nitra 2008. Nitra, Slovakia
 Temps d’Images, La Ferme du Buisson 2008. Paris, France
 dunaPart - Platform of Contemporary Hungarian Performing Arts 2008. Budapest, Hungary
 Krakowskie Reminiscencje Teatralne 2009. Kraków, Poland
 KunstenFestivalDesArts 2009. Brussels, Belgium
 Vienna Festival 2009. Vienna, Austria
 Mladi Levi International Festival 2009. Ljubljana, Slovenia
 New Drama Action Festival 2009. Vilnius, Lithuania
 Homo Novus Festival 2009. Riga, Latvia
 Festival de Keuze 2009. Rotterdamse Schouwburg, The Netherlands
 Europӓische Kulturtage 2010. Karlsruhe, Germany
 BITEF Festival 2010. Belgrade, Serbia
 Festival Bo:m 2011. Seoul, South Korea
 Santarcangelo Festival 2011. Santarcangelo, Italy
 F.I.N.D. 2013. Berlin, Germany
 National Theatre of Pécs 2014. Pécs, Hungary
 Transitions Central Europe Festival, Onassis Cultural Centre 2015. Athens, Greece
 Santiago a Mil International Theatre Festival 2017. Chile

Awards
Best performance - 8th National Theatre Festival 2008. Pécs, Hungary
Best actress: Lili Monori - 8th National Theatre Festival 2008. Pécs, Hungary
Audience Award - 8th National Theatre Festival 2008. Pécs, Hungary
Special Prize of BITEF - 44th BITEF Festival 2010. Belgrade, Serbia

The Ice 
The original staging of The Ice by Kornél Mundruczó is dated back to 2006, when it was a co-production between the Trafó House of Contemporary Arts and Krétakör Company. In 2008 the performance was revived with some new cast members at the National Theater of Budapest, where it was on the repertoire until 2013. Two years later the show was transferred to the Trafó again, this time under the umbrella of the Proton Theater.

Festival invitations
 Festspillene i Bergen 2008. Bergen, Norway
 International Theatre Festival "Kontakt" 2009. Toruń, Poland
 MESS International Theatre Festival 2009. Sarajevo, Bosnia and Herzegovina
 Vienna Festival 2010. Vienna, Austria
 Texture Film and Theatre Festival 2010. Perm, Russia
 19th International Festival Theatre 2011. Plzeň, Czech Republic
 HELLERAU - European Center for the Arts 2019. Dresden, Germany

Awards
 Best young creator: Kornél Mundruczó - XIX. Międzynarodowy International Theatre Festival "Kontakt" 2009. Toruń, Poland
Silver Laurel Wreath Award for Best Performance in the Mittel Europa category - MESS International Theatre Festival 2009. Sarajevo, Bosnia and Herzegovina
The Special Jury Award for Best Ensemble - MESS International Theatre Festival 2009. Sarajevo, Bosnia and Herzegovina
The Avaz Dragon Award - MESS International Theatre Festival 2009. Sarajevo, Bosnia and Herzegovina
Texture Name Prize - Texture Film and Theatre Festival 2010. Perm, Russia

References

External links 

In Conversation with Kornél Mundruczó, sifa.sg, 2015
Theatre review: Proton Theatre's Dementia is a little ward of horrors, straitstimes.com, Published: 14 Aug 2015(updated: 20 Jan 2016)

Theatres in Budapest